The 2016 Australian Dodgeball League season was the second to involved the Victorian Dodgeball League, and the first to involve the New South Wales Dodgeball League, with the second of these two leagues starting their inaugural season with 8 clubs that were eligible for competition points from both areas in Sydney and Newcastle, NSW.

League Tables

2016 Victorian Dodgeball League 
The 2016 Victorian Dodgeball League was the second year of the Victorian competition, with 23 teams entering into the league. The top two teams at the end of the year would be entered into 2017 Australian Dodgeball Championship series, subject to meeting criteria.

Finals

2016 New South Wales Dodgeball League 
The 2016 New South Wales Dodgeball League season is the first season of the new New South Wales dodgeball federation. The top two teams at the end of the year would be entered into 2017 Australian Dodgeball Championship series, subject to meeting criteria.

Finals

References 

Dodgeball
2016 in Australian sport